Daria Leonidovna Stolyarova (2012–2015 Isaeva, born 29 March 1990 in Moscow) is a Russian volleyball player, who plays as an opposite. She was a member of the Women's National Team. She plays for Dynamo Kazan.

Clubs
  Zarechie Odintsovo (2008–2013)
  Fakel Novy Ourengoï (2013–2014)
  Omichka Omsk Region (2014–2015)
  WVC Dynamo Kazan (2015-)

Awards

Individuals
 2013 Montreux Volley Masters "Best Server"
 Master of Sports of Russia

References

External links
 FIVB Profile

1990 births
Living people
Russian women's volleyball players
Place of birth missing (living people)
Sportspeople from Moscow
Volleyball players at the 2015 European Games
European Games competitors for Russia
Universiade medalists in volleyball
Universiade bronze medalists for Russia
Universiade gold medalists for Russia
Medalists at the 2011 Summer Universiade
20th-century Russian women
21st-century Russian women